Kofi Mensah (born March 8, 1978, in Koforidua, Ghana) is a former Dutch-Ghanaian footballer.

Career
Mensah began his career in 1996 at AFC Ajax. After three years with the club, he moved to NAC Breda. In June 2003, he moved again to ADO Den Haag. Mensah played for Anorthosis Famagusta FC in the 2004–05, but decided to leave after he had not received two months of salary. He then tried to get a contract at FC Emmen, Helmond Sport and SC Cambuur, but in vain. In February 2006, he moved to FC Omniworld until the end of the season.

International
He has played for Dutch youth selections.

Career

External links
Kofi Mensah vertelt over sportvissen, Amsjes en Almere City, vicesports.nl, 4 May 2018
Kofi Mensah Netherlands -19, onsoranje.nl

References

1978 births
Living people
Dutch footballers
Ghanaian footballers
Netherlands under-21 international footballers
AFC Ajax players
NAC Breda players
ADO Den Haag players
Anorthosis Famagusta F.C. players
Almere City FC players
Eredivisie players
Eerste Divisie players
Cypriot First Division players
Dutch expatriate footballers
Expatriate footballers in Cyprus
Dutch expatriate sportspeople in Cyprus
Ghanaian emigrants to the Netherlands
Ghanaian expatriate sportspeople in Cyprus
Association football defenders
People from Koforidua